3DO may refer to:
The 3DO Company, a video game company that developed:
3DO Interactive Multiplayer, a video game console, 1993–1997
List of 3DO games, a list of games released for the 3DO
3DO Blaster, an ISA add-on card for PCs which included the full chipset for the 3DO video game console
3DO Rating System, a rating system created by The 3DO Company and used on games released for the 3DO Interactive Multiplayer in the US and Canada